The House of Knabenau or von Knabenau (also known as Baron von Knabenau) is the name of an ancient Courland nobility, originally from Silesia , and later it spreads in the 16th century in Courland.

History
The family of Barons von Knabenau belong to the sideline of the Swabian Counts von Kyburg whose ancestor was Gotfried  from the Agilolfing dynasty and to the highest class of ancient Silesian and Courland nobility (German:Uradel). First time the family von Knabenau was mentioned on May 2, 1147 with knight  a Gotthard de Knabenau. The following mention refers to August 5, 1234, where  Bishop of Wrocław, Thomas I, calls Johann Ludwig von Knabenau the knight of Duke Henry II the Pious, Duke of Silesia. In addition to Johann Ludwig, many other family members were already known as landowners in the 13th century. From 1271 to 1278 for the Imperial Vogt Johann von Knabenau was granted temporary possession of the land  and Bolków Castle , which became the headquarters of the Barons von Knabenau from the Duke of Bolesław II the Bald. The unbroken family line begins with knight  a Hartvig von Knabenau, who is named in documents between 1454 and 1456. He was at the castle in Brandenburg during the siege. In 1620, Johann, Friedrich and Otto von Knabenau, signed an agreement and sealed the document about land ownership with the Archbishop of the county Piltene and with the Teutonic Order. Captain of the Knights of von Knabenau, distinguished himself in the rescue of Vienna from the Turks in 1683. The Diploma of Polish King John III Sobieski of 1685, Captain von Knabenau with his descending  offspring's, in the Kingdom of Poland set to in baronial dignity. In the decree on the resignation of December 31, 1822, Colonel Friedrich Johann von Knabenau was named as  Baron. Judgment of 05/16/1841, at approved the introduction in which  noble family von Knabenau, natives of the county Piltene  (Courland), allowed to be officially was matriculated in Courland knighthood. Baron dignity approved for name von Knabenau, government decrees Senate Courland noble Committee of 10 June 1853 and 28 February 1862 in pursuance of the Supreme Decree of 10 June 1853 and 28 February 1862 years (see the statement of the Senate 1853,1862).

Possessions
 Bolków Castle, Poland, ancestral seat
 Neu-Sallensee Manor, purchased in 1839 and Groß-Born Manor in  Courland (now Latvia) 
 Bagdoniškė Manor; Berghof Manor, acquired by Johann Friedrich Otto Baron von Knabenau in Vilna Governorate (now Lithuania)

References 

 von Knabenau in the All-Russia genealogical tree 
  Erik-Amburger-Datenbank – Datensatz anzeigen, von Knabenau

Notable family members
 Friedrich Baron von Knabenau (1651 – d.)    Baron, was a Swedish colonel and member of the Privy Council 
 Johann Friedrich von Knabenau (?-d. 29/10/1845) – Baron, Dec. 1815 staff-captain Novgorod cuirassier regiment; August, 1817 captain of the L.- Guards Hussars; in October, 1817 transferred to lieutenant colonel in Starodubsky Cuirassier Regiment; later on Retired Colonel (retired by decree on December 31, 1821). Taught high school students in the dressage arena on horseback courtiers reserve squadron in Tsarskoye Selo Lyceum (1816–1817)
 Georg Gotthard (Jerzy) von Knabenau (1723–1798) Baron, the captain of the troops of the Crown (1760). In 1764 he supported the candidacy of Stanislaw August Poniatowski to occupy the throne of the Commonwealth. From 1765 – Colonel troops crown. In 1767, he was close to the king and became his chamberlain. Commander of the Order of St. Stanislaus 1789. Died in Warsaw in 1798.
 Dorothea von Knabenau (de Chassepot de PISSY, countess)(1779–1848) was maid of honor of the Duchess of Courland. Johann Wolfgang von Goethe was in love with her.

Sources
 Neues allgemeines deutsches Adels-Lexicon
 Carl Arvid Klingspor: Baltisches Wappenbuch. Stockholm 1882, S. 48–61
 Scheibler'sches Wappenbuch, älterer Teil Jungingen Date 1450 – 1480 
 Georg Gotthard (Jerzy) von Knabenau 
 Dorothea von Knabenau (de Chassepot de PISSY, countess)  
 Johann Friedrich von Knabenau (?-d. 29/10/1845) 
 
 Roman W. Brüschweiler, Stammtafel der Häuser Lenzburg, Kyburg und Dillingen S. 108–109; in: Geschichte von Wettingen
 P. Brau, Gesch. der Gf.en v. Dillingen und K., Hist. Abh. der Akad. München 5, 1823
 C. Brun, Gesch. der Gf.en v. K. bis 1264 [Diss. Zürich 1913]
 M. Feldmann, Die Herrschaft der Gf.en v. K. im Aaregebiet 1218–26, 1926

External links
 Barons Von Knabenau 
 Barons von Knabenau 
  Barons von Knabenau 

Swedish noble families
Russian noble families
Baltic-German people
People from Courland
Baltic nobility
Latvian nobility
Livonian noble families